The Ottoman campaign against Hormuz took place in 1552–1554. An Ottoman fleet led by Admiral Piri Reis and Seydi Ali Reis was dispatched from the Ottoman harbour of Suez to eliminate the Portuguese presence from the northwestern part of the Indian Ocean, and especially their fortress at Hormuz Island.

Preliminaries
The Ottomans were able to take possession of Basra from Persia during the Ottoman–Safavid War (1532–1555). The Ottomans were then able to capture several key positions in the Persian Gulf. In 1550, they captured Qatīf.

In the 1552–1554 expedition, the Ottoman force consisted in 4 galleons, 25 galleys, and 850 troops, dispatched from the Ottoman harbour of Suez.

Sieges of Muscat and Hormuz
The fleet managed to sack Portuguese Muscat, modern Oman, in August 1552 in the Capture of Muscat. Soon, however, the Ottomans departed. However, they were unsuccessful in the Siege of Hormuz in September 1552.

Ultimately, the fleet managed to occupy and control the coasts of Yemen, Aden, and Arabia, as far north as Basra, so as to facilitate their trade with India. The fleet went up to Basra, then an Ottoman harbour. They were unable to capture Bahrain in 1559.

Meanwhile, during the year 1553, Seydi Ali Reis was leading an expedition against the Portuguese into the Indian Ocean, but he was unsuccessful.

Seydi Ali Reis and his galleys would be taken in an ambush (Battle of the Gulf of Oman)  by Portuguese forces while he was trying to bring back his fleet from Basra to Suez in August 1554.

See also
 Capture of Aden (1548)

References

Sources
 
 

Campaign against Hormuz
Campaign against Hormuz
Conflicts in 1552
Hormuz
Ottoman–Portuguese conflicts
1552 in Asia
1552 in the Ottoman Empire
Hormuz Island
16th century in Iran